Iver's was a department store with two locations north of Downtown Los Angeles: one at 5801 N. Figueroa in Highland Park, Los Angeles, and another at 663 Foothill Blvd. in La Cañada Flintridge.

The La Cañada Flintridge branch, which measured  and had sales of $5 million per year, was sold to Buffums in 1986. The location is now a TJ Maxx.

In Highland Park the Iver's store was the heart of the commercial strip (Figueroa Street around the present-day Gold Line light rail station) from 1913 through 1984 when it closed.

The chain was founded by Catherine and Jesse William Ivers as a notions and ribbons store.

References

Defunct department stores based in Greater Los Angeles
Highland Park, Los Angeles
La Cañada Flintridge, California